Holy Cross Polish National Catholic Church was a historic Polish National Catholic church at Third and Queen in Pe Ell, Washington.

The church was built in 1916 to serve Pe Ell's Polish immigrant community, which had come to the town to work in the local lumber industry. The building had a vernacular Gothic Revival design with two towers at its front corners. It was the last Polish National Catholic church in Washington until its demolition. It was added to the National Register in 1987.

Its condition deteriorated and the building was demolished in 2010.

References

Roman Catholic churches in Washington (state)
Churches on the National Register of Historic Places in Washington (state)
Gothic Revival church buildings in Washington (state)
Roman Catholic churches completed in 1916
Buildings and structures in Lewis County, Washington
Polish-American culture in Washington (state)
Demolished churches in the United States
Demolished buildings and structures in Washington (state)
National Register of Historic Places in Lewis County, Washington
20th-century Roman Catholic church buildings in the United States